The Arnos Vale Stadium is a cricket ground in Arnos Vale, near Kingstown, St. Vincent. The multi-use ground – part of Arnos Vale Sports Complex – is situated next to and to the west of the Arnos Vale Playing Field.

The stadium holds the capacity to accommodate 18,000 people and is mostly used for football and cricket matches.

History
The stadium hosted its first ever international game on 4 February 1981. The match was an ODI between West Indies and England and was a close encounter which the hosts won by two runs.

The ground's maiden Test match came in 1997, when the West Indies played Sri Lanka to a draw, with Sri Lanka finishing on 233–8 chasing a target of 269 runs. The second Test held at the ground, in 2009, saw Bangladesh record their maiden Test victory over the West Indies by 95 runs. At the time the West Indies were without many of their leading players due to a dispute with the West Indies Cricket Board, so seven Test debutantes featured in the West Indian team.

Ahead of the 2007 Cricket World Cup, hosted by the West Indies, Arnos Vale Sports Complex was renovated over a period of 18 months. The ground's playing area was enlarged, and on the eastern side of the ground a new stand, media centre, operations centre, and pavilion were constructed.

International centuries
There have been four Test and two ODI centuries scored at the venue.

Test centuries

ODI centuries

List of five-wicket hauls
There have been 12 five-wicket hauls in international cricket on the ground.

Test matches

One Day Internationals

See also
List of Test cricket grounds

Notes

References

External links

Football venues in Saint Vincent and the Grenadines
Cricket grounds in Saint Vincent and the Grenadines
Athletics (track and field) venues in Saint Vincent and the Grenadines
Saint Vincent and the Grenadines
Multi-purpose stadiums in Saint Vincent and the Grenadines
Test cricket grounds in the West Indies